2074 Shoemaker, provisional designation , is a stony Hungaria asteroid, Mars-crosser and suspected synchronous binary system from the innermost regions of the asteroid belt, approximately 4 kilometers in diameter. It was discovered on 17 October 1974, by astronomer Eleanor Helin at the Palomar Observatory. She named it after American astronomer Eugene Shoemaker.

Orbit and classification 

Shoemaker is a bright member of the dynamical Hungaria group that forms the innermost dense concentration of asteroids in the Solar System. It orbits the Sun in the inner main-belt at a distance of 1.7–1.9 AU once every 2 years and 5 months (882 days). Its orbit has an eccentricity of 0.08 and an inclination of 30° with respect to the ecliptic. With a perihelion of 1.6521 AU, Shoemaker is a Mars-crossing asteroid as it crosses the orbit of Mars at 1.666 AU.

The body's observation arc begins with a precovery taken at Palomar in April 1954, more than 20 years prior to its official discovery observation.

Physical characteristics 

In the SMASS classification, Shoemaker is a Sa-subtype, that transitions form the common stony S-type asteroids to the A-type asteroids.

Rotation period 

Several rotational lightcurve of Shoemaker were obtained from photometric observations by American astronomer Brian Warner at his Palmer Divide Observatory and CS3-Station. Analysis of the best-rated lightcurves gave a well-defined rotation period of 2.5328 hours with a brightness amplitude of 0.13 magnitude.

Suspected binary 

In October 2003, photometric observations of Shoemaker by Robert D. Stephens gave a long rotation period of 57.02 hours. After re-measuring the images with newer software and calibration techniques, two mutual occultation and eclipsing events were found, indicating that  Shoemaker might be a synchronous binary asteroid with a minor-planet moon orbiting it every 55 hours. Observations in 2010, were difficult due to incomplete coverage and gave an orbital period of 27.39 hours for the secondary. Observations by astronomers at Etscorn Campus Observatory in 2015, did not mention any mutual events.

In June 2017, Warner measured a rotation period of  hours and an orbital period for the secondary of 44.28 hours at his CS3-Palmer Divide Station in California. The binary nature of Shoemaker remains unconfirmed.

Diameter and albedo 

According to the survey carried out by the NEOWISE mission of NASA's Wide-field Infrared Survey Explorer, Shoemaker measures 3.18 and 3.22 kilometers in diameter  and its surface has an albedo between 0.41 and 0.52, respectively. The Collaborative Asteroid Lightcurve Link assumes a standard albedo for stony asteroids of 0.20 and calculates a diameter of 4.93 kilometers based on an absolute magnitude of 13.9.

Naming 

This minor planet was named by the discoverer after her colleague, the American astronomer Eugene Shoemaker (1928–1997), who was a discoverer of minor planets and of the Comet Shoemaker–Levy 9 that collided with Jupiter. He is well known for his work on impact craters and his role in the lunar Ranger, Surveyor and Apollo programs.

The naming was also proposed by Brian G. Marsden, the director of the Minor Planet Center (MPC). The official  was published by the Minor Planet Center on 1 November 1978.

Notes

References

External links 
 Asteroids with Satellites, Robert Johnston, johnstonsarchive.net
 Asteroid Lightcurve Database (LCDB), query form (info )
 Dictionary of Minor Planet Names, Google books
 Asteroids and comets rotation curves, CdR – Observatoire de Genève, Raoul Behrend
 Discovery Circumstances: Numbered Minor Planets (1)-(5000) – Minor Planet Center
 
 

002074
Discoveries by Eleanor F. Helin
Named minor planets
002074
002074
19741017